Concord Township is one of thirteen townships in Dixon County, Nebraska, United States. The population was 329 at the 2020 census. A 2021 estimate placed the township's population at 324.

See also
County government in Nebraska

References

External links
City-Data.com

Townships in Dixon County, Nebraska
Sioux City metropolitan area
Townships in Nebraska